Elections to the City of Melbourne were held via postal ballot in 2016 to elect 9 councillors to the council, as well as the direct election of the Lord Mayor and Deputy Lord Mayor of Melbourne. Independent Robert Doyle was re-elected as Lord Mayor for a third term.

Following the resignation of councillor-elect Brooke Wandin, a full recount of councillor ballots was ordered by the Victorian Civil and Administrative Tribunal on 14 March 2017.

Results

Mayoral election

|- style="background-color:#E9E9E9"
! colspan="6" style="text-align:left;" |After distribution of preferences

The VEC distributed preliminary preferences until an electoral ticket exceeded 50 per cent of the vote, in this case Independent candidates Robert Doyle and Arron Wood.

Councillor election

Aftermath
On 8 November, councillor-elect Brooke Wandin stood down from her position amid an investigation by the Local Government Investigations and Compliance Inspectorate into her eligibility. Wandin and former councillor Richard Foster were later charged with electoral fraud, with prosecutors alleging Wandin did not live at the Kensington address she had nominated when registering for election. Both parties plead guilty to charges of electoral fraud; Foster received a 12-month good behaviour bond, while Wandin was placed onto a diversion program.

As a result of Wandin standing down from the council, on 5 December 2016 the Municipal Electoral Tribunal ordered a countback of votes cast. The Victorian Electoral Commission appealed this decision to the Victorian Civil and Administrative Tribunal, seeking a full recount. On 14 March 2017, the Tribunal ruled in the Commission's favour. A full recount elected Nicolas Frances Gilley and Susan Riley as the eighth and ninth councilors respectively, displacing Michael Caiafa who would have been retained in a vote countback. Gilley and Riley were sworn into council on 21 March 2017.

References

External links
 

 2016
2016 elections in Australia
2010s in Melbourne